Cryptandra triplex is a species of flowering plant in the family Rhamnaceae and is endemic to the north of the Northern Territory. It is a hairy shrub with narrowly elliptic to lance-shaped or egg-shaped leaves and white to cream-coloured or yellowish, tube-shaped flowers arranged singly or in groups of up to 5 in leaf axils, near the ends of branches.

Description

Taxonomy and naming
Cryptandra triplex was first formally described in 2006 by Jürgen Kellermann in the journal Austrobaileya from an unpublished description by Kevin Thiele of specimens collected by Lyndley Craven near east Jabiru in 1981. The specific epithet (triplex) means "threefold", referring to the 3 carpels in the ovary.

Distribution and habitat
This cryptandra grows in shrubland and woodland on sandstone plateaux and rock outcrops, and is only known from Nitmiluk and Kakadu National Parks.

References

triplex
Rosales of Australia
Flora of the Northern Territory
Plants described in 2006